Vedevo is a rural locality (a village) in Karinskoye Rural Settlement, Alexandrovsky District, Vladimir Oblast, Russia. The population was 1 as of 2010. There is 1 street.

Geography 
Vedevo is located 16 km south of Alexandrov (the district's administrative centre) by road. Stepkovo is the nearest rural locality.

References 

Rural localities in Alexandrovsky District, Vladimir Oblast